Stephen Worobetz  (December 26, 1914 – February 2, 2006) was a Canadian physician and the 13th Lieutenant Governor of Saskatchewan.

Born in Krydor, Saskatchewan, of Ukrainian origin, he received a Bachelor of Science from the University of Saskatchewan in 1935 and a Doctor of Medicine from University of Manitoba in 1940. During World War II, he served as a medical officer with the Canadian Army in Italy and was awarded the Military Cross. After the war, he practised medicine in Saskatoon and studied to be a general surgeon in Winnipeg and Philadelphia.

From 1970 to 1976, he was the 13th Lieutenant Governor of Saskatchewan. As The Queen's representative in Saskatchewan, he carried out such duties as reading the Speech from the Throne, swearing in premiers and Cabinet ministers, opening legislative sessions, and bestowing honours upon Saskatchewan citizens. Afterwards he returned to his medical practice until his retirement in 1982.

In 1993, he was made an Officer of the Order of Canada. In 1999, he was awarded the Saskatchewan Order of Merit.

Worobetz died on February 2, 2006.

References
 Thomas M. Prymak, Maple Leaf and Trident: The Ukrainian Canadians During the Second World War (Toronto: Multicultural History Society of Ontario, 1988), pp. 136–7. Contains his citation for the Military Cross, awarded for bravery on the front lines.

External links
Order of Canada Citation

1914 births
2006 deaths
Canadian military doctors
Lieutenant Governors of Saskatchewan
Members of the Saskatchewan Order of Merit
Officers of the Order of Canada
Canadian recipients of the Military Cross
Canadian people of Ukrainian descent
Canadian military personnel of World War II
University of Saskatchewan alumni
Physicians from Saskatchewan